Be My Lover is the third studio album by R&B singer O'Bryan.

Reception

"Be My Lover" was O'Bryan's highest charting collection on the Billboard R&B Albums charts, peaking at No. 3. The first single — the insistent, chugging "Lovelite" — marched to the top of the Billboard R&B Singles chart. The success of "Lovelite" prompted Capitol to release "Breakin' Together" as the next single.

But it was O'Bryan's penchant for ballads — the quiet storm staple "Lady I Love You;" the lovelorn "You’re Always On My Mind;" and "Go On And Cry," which was the third single — that shone as the album’s highlights. The title track also became known as one of O'Bryan's better uptempo songs.

Track listing

Charts

Singles

Personnel
O'Bryan  – lead vocals, background vocals, synthesizers, electric piano, percussion
Paulinho da Costa – percussion
Melvin Davis – bass guitar, acoustic piano, Fender Rhodes piano, background vocals
Karl Denson – tenor saxophone, alto saxophone, horn arrangement
Darrell Frias – acoustic guitar, guitar
James Gadson – drums
Romy Geroso – guitar
Michael Norfleet – electric piano, acoustic piano
Johnny McGhee – acoustic guitar, guitar
Waters – background vocals
Bruce Miller – horn and string arrangements

References

External links
 O'Bryan-Be My Lover at Discogs

1984 albums
O'Bryan albums
Capitol Records albums
Boogie albums